Nick Aplin (born 7 March 1952) is a Senior Lecturer at the Physical Education and Sports Science Academic Group (PESS) at the National Institute of Education (NIE).

In 1971 he studied at Loughborough College for his degree in physical education (PE). He graduated in 1976.

In 1984 Nick Aplin studied a master's degree at Loughborough. In late 1985 he became a lecturer at the College of Physical Education in SIngapore. He completed a PhD in 1999.

Nick Aplin's first book, To the Finishing Line, was published in 2002. It was a set of biographical impressions of the first three Singaporean women Olympians: Tang Pui Wah, Mary Klass and Janet Jesudason. In 2009 he published Perspectives on Physical Education and Sports Science in Singapore. Alongside Tibor Károlyi, Aplin wrote a series of chess books. Endgame Virtuoso Anatoly Karpov was Guardians Chess Book of the Year in 2007.

Bibliography

References

1952 births
Living people
Chess writers
Singaporean non-fiction writers
British expatriates in Singapore
People educated at Poole Grammar School